Jackfish Lake may refer to:

 Jackfish Lake (Alberta), a lake in Alberta, Canada
 Jackfish Lake (Saskatchewan), a lake in Saskatchewan, Canada
 Jackfish, Saskatchewan, a community in Saskatchewan

See also 
Jack Fish (disambiguation)